Carlisle is a city in northwestern Warren and southern Montgomery counties in the southwestern part of the U.S. state of Ohio. The city is in Franklin Township, Warren County, Ohio and German Township, Montgomery County, Ohio.

The Warren County portion of Carlisle is part of the Cincinnati–Middletown, OH-KY-IN Metropolitan Statistical Area, while the Montgomery County portion is part of the Dayton, OH Metropolitan Statistical Area.

Carlisle is known for an area landmark: a "double UFO" house off Chamberlain Road, which resembles two silver-colored flying saucers connected by a metal duct. This is actually two Futuro houses combined into one residence.

History
Carlisle had its start in 1850 when the railroad was extended to that point and a train station was built. The village was named for "railroad man" George B. Carlisle, who in the mid-19th century "bought and platted a large section of the community". A post office was established at Carlisle in 1852, and remained in operation until 1961.

Carlisle's population increased from 4,872 in the 1990 census to 5,121 in the 2000 census; passing the threshold of 5,000, its designation was changed from village to city. As of the 2010 census, the population was 4,915; this population loss caused Carlisle to once again become a village. In the 2020 census, the population was 5,501; on October 20, 2021, Carlisle regained city status.

Geography

Carlisle is located at  (39.579836, -84.319288).

Demographics

2010 census
As of the census of 2010, there were 4,915 people, 1,866 households, and 1,430 families living in the city. The racial makeup of the city was 98.3% White, 0.4% African American, 0.1% Native American, 0.1% Asian, 0.2% from other races, and 0.8% from two or more races. Hispanic or Latino of any race were 1.0% of the population.

There were 1,866 households, of which 33.9% had children under the age of 18 living with them, 62.8% were married couples living together, 9.3% had a female householder with no husband present, 4.5% had a male householder with no wife present, and 23.4% were non-families. 20.6% of all households were made up of individuals, and 10.1% had someone living alone who was 65 years of age or older. The average household size was 2.60 and the average family size was 2.99.

The median age in the city was 40.5 years. 24.3% of residents were under the age of 18; 7.2% were between the ages of 18 and 24; 25% were from 25 to 44; 28.3% were from 45 to 64; and 15.1% were 65 years of age or older. The gender makeup of the city was 48.5% male and 51.5% female.

2000 census
As of the census of 2000, there were 5,121 people, 1,849 households, and 1,475 families living in the city. The population density was 1,504.7 people per square mile (581.5/km2). There were 1,937 housing units at an average density of 569.2 per square mile (220.0/km2). The racial makeup of the city was 98.38% White, 0.23% African American, 0.18% Native American, 0.29% Asian, 0.06% Pacific Islander, 0.14% from other races, and 0.72% from two or more races. Hispanic or Latino of any race were 0.58% of the population.

There were 1,849 households, out of which 36.9% had children under the age of 18 living with them, 66.9% were married couples living together, 8.9% had a female householder with no husband present, and 20.2% were non-families. 16.4% of all households were made up of individuals, and 5.3% had someone living alone who was 65 years of age or older. The average household size was 2.74 and the average family size was 3.08.

In the city the population was spread out, with 26.5% under the age of 18, 8.2% from 18 to 24, 31.1% from 25 to 44, 24.9% from 45 to 64, and 9.3% who were 65 years of age or older. The median age was 36 years. For every 100 females there were 102.2 males. For every 100 females age 18 and over, there were 100.5 males.

The median income for a household in the city was $45,446, and the median income for a family was $50,599. Males had a median income of $36,544 versus $26,300 for females. The per capita income for the city was $19,358. About 6.4% of families and 8.4% of the population were below the poverty line, including 10.4% of those under age 18 and 8.4% of those age 65 or over.

References

The New Jersey Settlement in Ohio
1800-1990
Written by Carlisle Citizens
Edited by Harriet E. Foley

External links
 City website
 Carlisle Local School District

Cities in Montgomery County, Ohio
Cities in Warren County, Ohio
Cities in Ohio